Peter John Dennis (25 October 1933 – 18 April 2009) was a Screen Actors Guild Award and Drama-Logue Award winning English film, television, theatre and voice actor. His extensive career spanned both sides of the Atlantic with projects ranging from The Avengers to Sideways. He was perhaps best known for his more than three decades association performing the works of A. A. Milne on stage in his one-man show entitled Bother! The Brain of Pooh.

Early life
Peter Dennis was born in Dorking, Surrey, the son of Michael Henry Dennis, a mechanical engineer, and Violet Frances Lockwood, a housewife. He was one of four children including two brothers, Michael and David, and a sister, Dorothy.

His early education was in a Roman Catholic convent. He continued his early studies in Portobello Road, London at the North Kensington Secondary School, until the age of 14. He spent the next four years training as an accountant and as a surveyor. While employed at T. S. Appleton & Son Ltd. in Shepherd's Bush, he was called up for his national service in the British Army.

He served as a Sergeant in Nigeria from January 1952 to March 1958, Royal Army Ordnance Corps, Royal Army Service Corps. His duties included drill and weapons training, shorthand writing in the service of Lieutenant General Sir Roderick McLeod and General Sir Nigel Poett, Director of Military Operations, and as a Personal Assistant to General Sir Kenneth Exham, General Officer Commanding the Royal West African Frontier Force, Nigerian Military Forces.

Upon his return to civilian life, he worked as Personal Assistant to Harry Arkle, European Managing Director, Canadian Pacific Railway and Bill Nicol, Deputy Chairman of Guest, Keen & Nettlefolds, Redditch, near Birmingham.

On his 29th birthday, Dennis saw his first play, a production of Look Back in Anger at the Birmingham Repertory Theatre starring Derek Jacobi, and dictated his resignation the following day. By the following autumn, he was in attendance at the Royal Academy of Dramatic Art graduating two years later in 1965.

Career
After graduating from RADA, he returned to the Birmingham Rep to play numerous leading roles. He went on to perform at the Everyman Theatre, Liverpool, the Liverpool Repertory Theatre, and in London's West End. He also began to be a regular presence on British television, appearing in The Avengers among many other shows.

14 October 1976 marked the premiere of his one-man show Bother! The Brain of Pooh at the ADC Theatre, Cambridge, given in celebration of the 50th anniversary of the publication of Winnie-the-Pooh written by A. A. Milne. It contained selected readings from When We Were Very Young, Winnie-the-Pooh, Now We Are Six, and The House at Pooh Corner.

At the invitation of Anna Strasberg, Head of the Actors Studio, Bother! received its American premiere in December 1986 at the Lee Strasberg Theatre and Film Institute in Hollywood, where it was honoured with the Drama-Logue Award and the Los Angeles Theatre Award. He continued to perform Bother! throughout the following decades at more than eighty venues throughout America and Europe, from the Hollywood Bowl under the baton of conductor George Daugherty to the Palace of Westminster in London at the invitation of the Prime Minister.

His American television career grew to include appearances on a number of popular series including Friends, Murphy Brown, Alias, Seinfeld, Prime Suspect, and Murder, She Wrote. Highlights of his film career include Sideways and Shrek.

Dennis often wore bow ties, and many of his roles featured him wearing one.

Death
Dennis died on 18 April 2009 in Shadow Hills, Los Angeles, California, USA.

Awards
LA Weekly Theatre Award
Drama-Logue Award
Corporation for Public Broadcasting Silver Award
Achievement of Merit Ohio State Award
Audie Award
Parents' Choice Award Gold Award
Screen Actors Guild Ensemble Award Sideways

Filmography
 Confessions of a Window Cleaner (1974) – Waiter
 The Stud (1978) – Marc
 Scandalous (1984) – Maitre D'
 A Man Called Sarge (1990) – Montgomery
 The Rainbow Thief (1990) – Winter
 The Emissary: A Biblical Epic (1997) – Master
 The Effects of Magic (1998) – Gough
 Second Generation (2000) – Bus conductor
 Shrek (2001) – Ogre Hunter (voice)
 Hellborn (2003) – Dr. Flannery
 Sideways (2004) – Leslie Brough
 Psychonauts (2005) – Collie (voice)
 Eragon (2006) – (voice)
 Man in the Chair (2007) – Bernie
 Monster Safari (2007) – Basil Pennyfarthing
 Ten Inch Hero (2007) – Mr. Julius
 Beowulf (2007) – (voice)

Television

 No Hiding Place (1965) – Police doctor
 The Rat Catchers (1966) – Teniente
 The Avengers (1967) – Private
 The Troubleshooters (1968) – TV Interviewer
 Detective (1968) – Personal Assistant
 Hadleigh (1973–1976) – Sutton
 Hold the Front Page (1974) – The Judge
 Dial M for Murder (1974) – Insp. Palmer
 How's Your Father (1975) – Doctor Clegg
 The Famous Five (1978) – Roland
 Grange Hill (1982) – Mr Brocklehurst
 Crown Court (1982) – Dr. Edwin Harper
 Never the Twain (1982) – Vicar
 Yes Minister (1982) – Undersecretary Air Division
 The Cleopatras (1983) – Diomedes
 Minder (1984–1985) – Club owner / Geoffrey
 Minder on the Orient Express (1985) – Club owner (uncredited)
 C.A.T.S. Eyes (1985–87) – Hathcott / Desmond Proudfoot
 The Great Escape II: The Untold Story (1988) – Group Capt. Massey
 War and Remembrance (1988) – Gen. Sir Bernard Law Montgomery
 Prime Suspect (1991) – Toastmaster
 To Be the Best (1991) – Doctor
 Murder, She Wrote (1992) – Albert
 Murphy Brown (1992) – Psychiatrist #3
 Melrose Place (1992) – Jeweler #1
 The Adventures of Brisco County, Jr. (1993–1994) – Reginald
 Acapulco H.E.A.T. (1994) – Dr. Monroe
 Young Indiana Jones and the Hollywood Follies (1994) – Pete
 Prehysteria! 3 (1995) – Snooty Driver
 Saved by the Bell: The New Class (1995) – Mr Hathaway
 Mad TV (1995) – Announcer
 Step by Step (1996) – Auctioneer
 Townies (1996) – Dealer
 Friends (1996) – Sherman Whitfield
 Mr. Rhodes (1996) – Flemings
 Star Trek: Voyager (1996-2001) – Admiral Hendricks / Isaac Newton
 Profiler (1997) – Dr. Joel Kaiser
 In the House (1997) – Violinist
 Tracey Takes On... (1997) – Lord Percy
 Family Matters (1997) – Captain Hightower
 Seinfeld (1997) – Lew
 H.M.S. Pinafore (1997) – Sailor
 Felicity (1999) – Star Wars Fan
 Alias (2001) – Professor Bloom

Theatre
 The Body (2004)
 Bother! The Brain of Pooh (1976–2009)
 Speak of the Devil

Recordings
"The Complete Works of Winnie-the-Pooh" by A. A. Milne
"The Tigger Movie", Walt Disney Records
"102 Dalmatians", Walt Disney Records
"The Seven Deadly Sins", Jazz Suite with Phil Woods
"The Children’s Suite" by Phil Woods
"The Strange Affliction" by Norman Corwin, with Samantha Eggar, Carl Reiner and Norman Lloyd

References

External links
Pooh Corner

 Obituary in The Daily Telegraph
 Obituary in The Independent

People from Dorking
Alumni of RADA
English male film actors
English male television actors
English male stage actors
English male voice actors
English expatriates in the United States
British expatriate male actors in the United States
Royal Army Ordnance Corps soldiers
Royal Army Service Corps soldiers
Male actors from Surrey
1933 births
2009 deaths
British colonial army soldiers
20th-century British Army personnel